Jeff Strain is an American entrepreneur, CEO, and founder of three independent video game studios, most recently Possibility Space. 

In 2000, Strain cofounded ArenaNet, where he worked as an executive producer and programmer on the popular online roleplaying game Guild Wars. ArenaNet was acquired by NCsoft in 2002, and Strain went on to become President of Product Development for the company's North American and European operations. 

Strain left NCsoft in 2009 and founded Undead Labs, creators of zombie survival series State of Decay. Microsoft acquired Undead Labs in 2018. As of August 2021, State of Decay 2 had over 10 million players worldwide. 

In August of 2021, Strain published an open letter, calling for full unionization in the games industry.

In 2021, Jeff founded Possibility Space, a distributed studio based in New Orleans, LA. According to a press release, Strain and his team are working on "a joyful game that's been [his] dream for many years." In an interview, Strain said the game will be a AAA title.

Strain previously worked as a lead programmer on Blizzard Entertainment's MMORPG World of Warcraft; he also created the StarCraft campaign editor and worked on Diablo and Warcraft III.

References

 How to Create a Successful MMO, Strain's 2007 Games Convention speech
 MMOZed, Community website following Undead Labs
 Undead Labs Zombie MMO Facts  Everything we know about Undead Labs Zombie MMO from VGRevolution.com

Video game programmers
Video game designers
Living people
Year of birth missing (living people)